The men's 5000 metres event at the 1988 World Junior Championships in Athletics was held in Sudbury, Ontario, Canada, at Laurentian University Stadium on 28 and 30 July.

Medalists

Results

Final
30 July

Heats
28 July

Heat 1

Heat 2

Participation
According to an unofficial count, 31 athletes from 21 countries participated in the event.

References

5000 metres
Long distance running at the World Athletics U20 Championships